A list of British films released in 1929. These consists of various genres.

1929

A-M

P-Z

See also
1929 in British music
1929 in British television
1929 in film
1929 in the United Kingdom

References

External links

1929
Films
Lists of 1929 films by country or language
1920s in British cinema